Don Juan is a 1998 French-language film written and directed by Jacques Weber, starring Weber himself, alongside Michel Boujenah, Penélope Cruz, and Emmanuelle Béart. The screenplay is based on the play Dom Juan by Molière.

Plot
Spain in the mid-seventeenth century. A series of bloody wars has ravaged the nation. Don Juan the nobleman and his servants Sganarelle and La Violette roam the countryside on horseback, pursued by the brothers Alonse and Carlos, who seek revenge for the insult to the honor of their sister, Donna Elvire. Don Juan seduces two young women, Mathurine and Charlotte, who fight with each other to win his heart. In the end, Don Juan meets with his father and mother and repents for his past sins.

Cast and characters
 Jacques Weber as Don Juan
 Michel Boujenah as Sganarelle
 Emmanuelle Béart as Elvire
 Penélope Cruz as Mathurine
 Ariadna Gil as Charlotte
 Denis Lavant as Pierrot
 Michael Lonsdale as Don Luis
 Jacques Frantz as Don Alonse
 Pierre Gérard as Carlos
 Arnaud Bedouët as La Violette
 Philippe Khorsand as Monsieur Dimanche
 Lucas Uranga as Gossiper
 Pedro Casablanc as Lucas
 Claudia Gravy as Don Juan's Mother
 Xavier Thiam as La Ramée

Awards and nominations
 César Awards (France)
 Nominated: Best Costume Design (Sylvie de Segonzac)

References

External links
 
 

1998 films
1998 comedy films
Films based on works by Molière
Spanish films based on plays
German films based on plays
French films based on plays
Films shot in Almería
French comedy films
Films scored by Bruno Coulais
1990s French-language films
1990s French films